"I Really Didn't Mean It" is an 1987 song by American recording R&B/soul artist Luther Vandross. The track was the fourth and final single released from his multi-platinum album Give Me the Reason. The song was a top ten R&B hit on Billboards Hot Black Singles chart.

Charts

References

1987 singles
Luther Vandross songs
1986 songs
Songs written by Marcus Miller
Songs written by Luther Vandross
Epic Records singles